Eyes of a Woman is the second English-language solo studio album by Swedish singer and former ABBA member Agnetha Fältskog, and her eighth studio album overall. It was released in March 1985.

Background
The album was recorded in the Polar Music Studios in Stockholm. Sessions began in early October 1984 and lasted until the end of November. The album was produced by Eric Stewart of 10cc and features former 10cc members Rick Fenn and Vic Emerson as session musicians, as well as Stewart's longtime friend Justin Hayward of The Moody Blues.

Notable songwriters who contributed to the album included Jeff Lynne, John Wetton and Geoff Downes as well as Justin Hayward and Eric Stewart himself. Long time ABBA fan Elvis Costello submitted a track "Shatterproof" for inclusion on the album, however Fältskog decided against recording it.
Two of the songs recorded, "Turn the World Around" and "You're There", were not included on the initial album, but were released as B-sides. "You're There" and "I Won't Let You Go" were composed by Fältskog herself with lyrics by Eric Stewart.

During the photo sessions for the sleeve of the album, Agnetha posed at the terrace of Drottningholm Palace, the official residence of the Swedish royal family, in Stockholm.

Release
The tracks "One Way Love" and "I Won't Let You Go" were released as singles throughout Europe. Agnetha also performed "One Way Love" at the Montreux Music Festival in 1985. Eyes of a Woman became Fältskog's second album to reach the UK Top 40, reaching No. 38. In Sweden, the album peaked at No. 2. It also reached the Top 20 in Norway, the Netherlands and Belgium, and the Top 30 in West Germany.

The album was reissued in 2005 with the singles' B-sides and the non-album single "The Way You Are" as bonus tracks.

Track listing 
Side One
 "One Way Love" (Jeff Lynne) – 3:36
 "Eyes of a Woman" (Paris Edvinson, Marianne Flynner) – 3:56
 "Just One Heart" (Paul Muggleton, Bob Noble) – 3:43
 "I Won't Let You Go" (Agnetha Fältskog, Eric Stewart) – 3:39
 "The Angels Cry" (Justin Hayward) – 4:22
 "Click Track" (Jan Ince, Phil Palmer) – 2:52
Side Two
 "We Should Be Together" (Jay Gruska, Tom Keane) – 3:57
 "I Won't Be Leaving You" (Eric Stewart) – 5:32
 "Save Me (Why Don't Ya)" (Eric Stewart) – 4:37
 "I Keep Turning Off Lights" (China Burton) – 3:37
 "We Move As One" (John Wetton, Geoffrey Downes) – 4:04

2005 Remastered Bonus Tracks:
 "You're There" (Agnetha Fältskog, Eric Stewart) – 3:29
 "Turn the World Around" (Randy Edelman)– 4:15
 "I Won't Let You Go" (Extended Version) (Agnetha Fältskog, Eric Stewart) – 6:02
 "The Way You Are" (with Ola Håkansson) (Tim Norell, Ola Håkansson, Alexander Bard) – 3:45
 "Fly Like the Eagle" (with Ola Håkansson) (Tim Norell, Ola Håkansson, Alexander Bard) – 3:05

Personnel 
 Agnetha Fältskog – lead vocals, backing vocals
 Eric Stewart – Fender Rhodes, percussion, backing vocals
 Vic Emerson – keyboards, synthesizers
 Rick Fenn – guitars
 Justin Hayward – guitars (5)
 Rutger Gunnarsson – bass
 Jamie Lane – drums (1, 3-11)
 Per Allsing – drums (2)
 Mel Collins – sax solos (1, 7)
 Marianne Flynner – backing vocals
 Anders Glenmark – backing vocals
 Karin Glenmark – backing vocals
 John Wetton – backing vocals (11)

Production
 Eric Stewart – producer, cover concept 
 Paris Edvinson – engineer, mixing (1, 2, 3, 6-11)
 Michael B. Tretow – mixing (4, 5)
 Gundars Rullis – tape operator 
 Göran Stelin – mastering 
 Stig Anderson – album coordinator
 Thomas Johansson – album coordinator
 David Edwards – studio coordinator
 Richard Evans – design 
 Icon – design 
 Tony McGee – photography 
 Christoffer Edgwick – photography assistant 
 Tusse Nilsson – photography assistant 
 Lolo Murray – stylist

Charts

References

1985 albums
Agnetha Fältskog albums
Albums produced by Eric Stewart